'WNNR' (970 AM) is a radio station broadcasting a Regional Mexican radio format. Licensed to Jacksonville, Florida, United States, the station is currently owned by Norsan Consulting And Management, Inc.

Programming is also heard on FM translator station 'W222BI' at 92.9 in Stockade, near the University of North Florida campus.  The station's moniker uses the FM translator’s frequency, as La Raza 92.9.

History
The station went on the air as WVOJ on March 1, 1984.  On January 29, 2004, the station changed its call sign to the current WNNR.

References

External links

NNR
Radio stations established in 1984
1984 establishments in Florida